The post of Minister of Defence was responsible for co-ordination of defence and security from its creation in 1940 until its abolition in 1964. The post was a Cabinet-level post and generally ranked above the three service ministers, some of whom, however, continued to also serve in Cabinet.

The Ministry of Defence was created in 1947.

History

Prior to the outbreak of the Second World War, concerns about British forces being understrength led in 1936 to the creation of the post of Minister for Coordination of Defence by Prime Minister Stanley Baldwin. The post was abolished by Baldwin's successor Neville Chamberlain in April 1940.

On his appointment as Prime Minister in May 1940, Winston Churchill created for himself the new post of Minister of Defence. The post was created in response to previous criticism that there had been no clear single minister in charge of the prosecution of the war.  In 1946, the post became the only cabinet-level post representing the military, with the three service ministers—the Secretary of State for War, the First Lord of the Admiralty, and the Secretary of State for Air—now formally subordinated to the Minister of Defence.

In 1964, the creation of a single, merged Ministry of Defence and the abolition of the separate service ministries in the UK led to the creation of the new post of Secretary of State for Defence, more popularly known as Defence Secretary.

Ministers of Defence, 1940–1964

The post of Minister of Defence was abolished in 1964 and replaced by the new post of Secretary of State for Defence.

See also

 Secretary of State for Defence
 Ministry of Defence (1947–1964)

References

Defence
Defunct ministerial offices in the United Kingdom
1964 disestablishments in the United Kingdom